Sembrouthes was a King of the Kingdom of Aksum. He is known only from a single inscription in Ancient Greek that was found at Dekemhare (ደቀምሓረ ድንበዛን), Hamasien in modern-day Eritrea, which is dated to his 24th regnal year. Sembrouthes was the first known ruler in the lands later ruled by the Emperor of Ethiopia to adopt the title "King of Kings".

S. C. Munro-Hay places his reign in a gap between `DBH and DTWNS, or c.250. However, W.R.O. Hahn, in a study published in 1983, assigns Sembrouthes to the 4th century, between Aphilas and Ezana. He also identifies him with Ousanas or the legendary Ella Amida.

Munro-Hay also suggests that Sembrouthes may have been the ruler who erected the anonymous Monumentum Adulitanum. The latter is an inscription at Adulis that Cosmas Indicopleustes made a copy of for king Kaleb of Axum.

Notes 

Kings of Axum
3rd-century monarchs in Africa